Datuk Rosni binti Sohar (born 1 February 1958) is a Malaysian politician and the Selangor State Assemblywoman representing Hulu Bernam.

Election Results

Honours

Honours of Malaysia
  :
  Commander of the Order of Meritorious Service (PJN) – Datuk (2017)
  :
  Companion Class I of the Order of Malacca (DMSM) – Datuk (2010)

References

Living people
1958 births
Members of the Selangor State Legislative Assembly
Women MLAs in Selangor
United Malays National Organisation politicians
Commanders of the Order of Meritorious Service